Ghumman or Ghuman is a clan of Jats and a surname in India and Pakistan ,  mainly located in Sialkot District, Jhelum District, Gujranwala District and some other districts of Punjab, Pakistan. In India, they are mainly located in Gurdaspur district Amritsar district and Tarn taran district of Majha Punjab, India Due to Sikh Expansion during 17th , 18th century and division of Historical Punjab.These are found in significant populations in Patiala district Ambala district and Kurukshetra district in Malwa and Haryana till Yamuna River. Almost All of these Jat Sikhs and Hindu Jaat villages have origins in Khalsa Army recruited from village Ghuman Kalan in Gurdaspur district

Notable people with this surname
 Muhammad Ilyas Ghuman, Pakistani cleric
 Azeem Ghumman, Pakistani cricketer
 Kapur Singh Ghuman, Indian writer and theatre actor
 Varinder Singh Ghuman, Indian bodybuilder and wrestler

References

External links
 Jat (caste) on Encyclopedia Britannica

Ghumman
Punjabi-language surnames
Ethnic groups in Pakistan
Ethnic groups in India
Pakistani names
Indian names
Jat clans of Punjab